Great White is the first full-length album by the American rock band Great White. Three tracks are taken from the band's previous EP, albeit in re-recorded versions. The musical style of this album is very different from the following highly successful releases of Great White, as they display here a more hard-driving metal sound as opposed to their later, blues-infused rock sound. EMI America judged the album a disaster and Great White was dropped. This led to a rethink by the band, and they became less heavy, introducing a tame hard rock sound for later albums.

The CD reissue of 1999, done under the name Stick It by the French label Axe Killer, features five bonus tracks.

Track listing 
Side one
 "Out of the Night" (Mark Kendall, Jack Russell, Gary Holland, Lorne Black) – 2:56
 "Stick It" (Kendall, Russell, Holland, Black, Alan Niven) – 3:56
 "Substitute" (Pete Townshend) – 4:20
 "Bad Boys" (Kendall, Russell, Holland, Black, Niven) – 4:18
 "On Your Knees" (Kendall, Russell, Holland, Black, Don Dokken) – 3:50

Side two
"Streetkiller" (Kendall, Russell, Holland, Black) – 3:57
 "No Better Than Hell" (Kendall, Russell, Holland, Black, Michael Wagener) – 4:06
 "Hold On" (Kendall, Russell, Holland, Black) – 4:13
 "Nightmares" (Kendall, Russell, Holland, Black, Niven) – 3:18
 "Dead End" (Kendall, Russell, Holland, Black) – 3:33

Stick It 1999 CD reissue bonus tracks 
"Down at the Doctor" (Mickey Jupp) – 3:40 (Dr. Feelgood cover)
"Train to Nowhere" (Kim Simmonds, Chris Youlden) – 4:27 (Savoy Brown cover)
"The Hunter" (Carl Wells, Donald "Duck" Dunn, Steve Cropper, Al Jackson, Jr., Booker T. Jones) – 4:12 (Albert King cover)
"Red House" (Jimi Hendrix) – 8:46 (Jimi Hendrix cover)
"Rock 'n' Roll" (Jimmy Page, Robert Plant, John Paul Jones, John Bonham) – 3:44 (Led Zeppelin cover)

Personnel

Great White 
Jack Russell – lead and backing vocals
Mark Kendall – guitar, backing vocals
Lorne Black – bass, backing vocals
Gary Holland – drums, backing vocals

Additional musicians 
Alan Niven – backing vocals, management
Gary Gersh, Mark Wesley, Phylis Koch, Tom The Razzman – backing vocals
Michael Lardie – backing vocals, assistant engineer

Production 
Michael Wagener – producer, engineer, mixing
Wyn Davis – assistant engineer
Greg Fulginti – mastering

Charts

Album

Singles

Stick It

References 

Great White albums
1984 debut albums
EMI Records albums
Albums produced by Michael Wagener